Alioune Ba may refer to:
 Alioune Bâ (born 1959), Malian photographer
 Alioune Ba (footballer) (born 1989), French footballer